Stav Finish is an Israeli footballer who currently plays for F.C. Dimona.

Honours
Israel State Cup (1):
2017

References

1992 births
Living people
Israeli Jews
Israeli footballers
Bnei Yehuda Tel Aviv F.C. players
Maccabi Netanya F.C. players
F.C. Dimona players
Israeli Premier League players
Liga Leumit players
Footballers from Yavne
Association football midfielders